Jim Fagan (24 May 1882 – 20 March 1948) was an  Australian rules footballer who played with St Kilda in the Victorian Football League (VFL).

Notes

External links 

1882 births
1948 deaths
Australian rules footballers from Victoria (Australia)
St Kilda Football Club players
North Melbourne Football Club (VFA) players